The American Measurement Standard is an authoritative measurement standard for use with single-family dwellings. The AMS 2020 edition is a voluntary guide developed for the measurement, calculation, and communication of square footage in residential dwellings.

Description
This standard defines eight specific categories for the reporting of all space associated with a residential dwelling. The AMS helps to establish common and logical definitions of "finished square footage" and "gross living area." The methodology of the American Measurement Standard was compiled and edited by a consensus of real estate professionals including real estate agents, appraisers, assessors, home builders and architects, and is based on the exterior dimensions of a dwelling. The AMS contains over three times more specific home measurement details than any other square footage guideline and includes numerous illustrations and examples. The standard provides acceptable square footage calculations for use in residential mortgage appraisals, and provides acceptable measurements for mortgage lenders. The principles and practices detailed in the standard have been used for generations in professional appraisal reports.

References 
 Thomas, David Hampton (2009). The American Measurement Standard. .
Size Matters-Residential Square Footage.  and
How to Measure a House. .
Realtor Magazine. "In Search of A Standard." September 2008.
Approved for use by the Mississippi Appraisal Board. January 2019. 

Continuing education course in Home Measurement Basics (based on the AMS) approved by the Arizona and California Appraisal Boards (2010). 
Part of the course ANSI, Home Measurement & the Power of Price-Per-Square-Foot. www.Appraserelearning.com 2019. 
https://web.archive.org/web/20081024100642/http://www.realtor.org/rmonews_and_commentary/opinion/0809commentarysquarefootage
Realtor University – Webinar Series Size Matters Based on the AMS 

Real estate in the United States